The Chinati Mountains Caldera Complex is a caldera complex located primarily in the Chinati Mountains within the Trans-Pecos Volcanic Field in Texas, United States. It is the largest and most documented volcano within the Trans-Pecos Volcanic Field, consisting mostly of two calderas: the Infernito Caldera and the Chinati Mountain Caldera. The main caldera, Chinati Mountain, erupted about 32-31 million years ago which resulted in the deposition of the Mitchell Mesa Tuff. The Infernito Caldera predates the Chinati Mountains Caldera, having deposited the Infernito Tuff about 37 million years ago. It was partially destroyed by the formation of the Chinati Mountains Caldera.

References

Landforms of Presidio County, Texas
Volcanoes of Texas
Oligocene calderas
Calderas of Texas